Zimbabwean national cricket team toured India in 2000-01 season. The tour lasted from 8 November to 14 December and included series of 2 Tests and 5 One Day Internationals. India won the Test series by 1-0 and ODIs series by 4-1.

Tour matches

Three-day: National Cricket Academy XI v Zimbabwe XI

Three-day: Indian Board President's XI v Zimbabwe XI

Test series

1st Test

2nd Test

ODI series

1st ODI

2nd ODI

3rd ODI

4th ODI

5th ODI

References 

2000–01
2000 in Indian cricket
2001 in Indian cricket
2000 in Zimbabwean cricket
2001 in Zimbabwean cricket
International cricket competitions in 2000–01
Indian cricket seasons from 2000–01